Useem is a surname. Notable persons with the surname include:

John Useem (1910–2000), American anthropologist and sociologist, husband of Ruth Hill Useem
Michael Useem, American economist and professor
Ruth Hill Useem (1915–2003), American anthropologist and sociologist